Epsilon Tucanae (ε Tuc, ε Tucanae) is a solitary star in the southern constellation of Tucana. With an apparent visual magnitude of +4.50, it is faintly visible to the naked eye. Based upon an annual parallax shift of 8.74 mas as seen from Earth, it is located around 373 light years from the Sun.

Levenhagen and Leister (2008) classified this star as B8 V, indicating a blue-white hued B-type main sequence star. However, Hiltner, Garrison, and Schild (1969) listed it with a classification of B9 IV, suggesting it may be a more evolved subgiant star. It is a rapidly rotating Be star that is an estimated 78% of the way through its main sequence lifetime. The projected rotational velocity is 300 km/s, which is giving it an oblate shape with an equatorial bulge that is an estimated 36% larger than the polar radius.

It is the last star in the Hipparcos catalogue, HIP 118322, from the Hipparcos (1989–1993) astrometry satellite.

References

B-type main-sequence stars
Be stars
Tucanae, Epsilon
Tucana (constellation)
Durchmusterung objects
224686
118322
9076